"Allentown Jail" is a folk-style song, written by Irving Gordon.

Background
it tells the story of a man who is caught stealing a diamond for his girlfriend and ends up in the Allentown jail.

Recordings
In 1951, Jo Stafford recorded this song. It was released as a single on Columbia Records.
In 1960, Kathy Linden recorded it as her first single on Monument Records.
The Kingston Trio recorded a version in 1962, as the song became popular in the folk scene.  The trio had plans of releasing it as a single, but the single never came to fruition. Their version has since been released on various CD compilations of their works.
In 1963, a more harmonic arrangement was performed by The Lettermen and released as a single. This version incurred some success, but only to a minor degree.

Other recordings
Other artists who recorded this song include The Seekers, The Springfields, Billy Strange, and British singers Lita Roza and Karen Young. There is also a French adaptation of the song, "Les prisons du roy", by Edith Piaf, which was later covered by Marianne Faithfull.

References

1951 songs
1960 singles
1963 singles
Songs written by Irving Gordon
The Lettermen songs
Jo Stafford songs
Kathy Linden songs
Capitol Records singles
Monument Records singles
Culture of Allentown, Pennsylvania